Ngāti Hako is a Māori iwi of New Zealand.  The people of Ngati Hako are acknowledged as the earliest settlers in the Hauraki region. Although Ngati Hako endured long periods of conflict with the Marutūāhu peoples, they were never completely overcome. They have maintained a presence in Hauraki to the present day. Their origins are not known, but it is suggested that they belonged to the ancient Te Tini o Toi people, who were descendants of the Polynesian navigator Toitehuatahi.

The survival of Ngati Hako through the period of Marutūāhu expansion was assisted by a strategic marriage. The high-born Ngati Hako woman Ruawehea was married to Tamatera, the son of Marutūāhu. The special relationship between Ngati Hako and the lands of Hauraki is recalled in their traditional call of welcome.

See also
List of Māori iwi